Kenia Rodríguez (born 2 March 1973) is a Cuban judoka. She competed in the women's half-middleweight event at the 2000 Summer Olympics.

References

1973 births
Living people
Cuban female judoka
Olympic judoka of Cuba
Judoka at the 2000 Summer Olympics
Place of birth missing (living people)
Pan American Games medalists in judo
Pan American Games bronze medalists for Cuba
Judoka at the 1991 Pan American Games
Judoka at the 1999 Pan American Games
Medalists at the 1991 Pan American Games
Medalists at the 1999 Pan American Games
20th-century Cuban women
21st-century Cuban women